Lebanon competed at the 2018 Mediterranean Games in Tarragona, Spain from 22 June to 1 July 2018.

Medals

Weightlifting 

Mahassen Hala Fattouh won the silver medal in the women's 63 kg Clean & Jerk event.

References 

Nations at the 2018 Mediterranean Games
2018
2018 in Lebanese sport